The Vuelta a Antioquia is a road cycling race held annually in the Antioquia Department of Colombia.

The first edition of the race, known as the Clásica Antioquia - Postobón, took place from 15 to 19 April 1973. Sponsored by the Postobón soft drink brand, it was organized by the Antioquia Cycling League. Sixty participants entered the race, which was divided into five stages and covered nearly 650 kilometers.

Winners

References

Cycle races in Colombia
Recurring sporting events established in 1973
Men's road bicycle races
1973 establishments in Colombia